MGM Children's Matinees were a series of vintage MGM family films that were re-released to theatres between 1970 and 1972. As the name implies, they were shown only as Saturday and Sunday matinées, usually just before the showing of the main feature which happened to be playing at the theatre at that time.

List of titles 
The films ranged from old favorites such as The Wizard of Oz (1939), Lassie Come Home (1943), and The Secret Garden (1949), to later widescreen films such as the 1960 remake of The Adventures of Huckleberry Finn, to then-recent fare such as Clarence, the Cross-Eyed Lion.

It also featured the 1970 Chuck Jones cult feature The Phantom Tollbooth.

History 
All the trailers for the films in the series were newly created, using footage from the original trailers of the films, and combining them with new narration.  For example, the narration for the series trailer for Forbidden Planet targeted the boys in the audience and focused solely on the science fiction elements, and "Robby the Robot", 
and none of the romance between Leslie Nielsen and Anne Francis.

The series was discontinued after 1971.

Competitors 
Paramount Pictures launched a similar franchise, Paramount Family Matinee, that also repackaged reissues of family films with newly imported recent releases, like Hello Down There (1968), Willy Wonka and the Chocolate Factory (1971), Charlotte's Web (1973), Alice in a New Wonderland (1966), Tom Thumb (1972), Aladdin and His Magic Lamp (1970), Black Beauty (1971), The Magic of the Kite (1958), Kingdom in the Clouds (1969), Rumpelstiltskin (1955), Heidi, Child of the Mountain (1952) and its sequel Heidi and Peter (1955), from 1974 until 1976.

See also
Clubhouse Pictures, the family-friendly label of Atlantic Releasing Corporation that ran from 1986 until 1987. 
Warner Bros. Family Entertainment, the family film and television brand of Warner Bros. Entertainment which lasted from 1992 to 2009.
Turner Classic Movies

References

Children's film series
American children's films
Children's Matinees
1970s in film